Diarmaid of Armagh (died ) was Bishop of Armagh. He was made Bishop of Armagh in 834, but was driven from his see by the usurper Foraunan in 835. However, he claimed his rights and collected his cess in Connacht, in 836. He lived in a stormy age, as the Scandinavian rovers under Turgesius seized Armagh in 841 and leveled the churches. The Annals of Ulster describe him as one of  "the wisest of the doctors of Europe". He is also known as Saint Dermot, and his feast is celebrated on 24 April .

9th-century Irish bishops
People from County Armagh